Meghpar Kumbhardi is a village in Anjar Taluka in Kutch District of Gujarat of India. It is located on Anjar to Galpadar Road. About the history of Meghpar it is one of the 18 villages founded by Kutch Gurjar Kshatriyas or Mistris of Kutch. It is located at a distance of about 4  km from Taluka Headquarters Anjar.  The famous Malkeshwar Mahadev Temple is located nearby. It is also known as Meghpar-Borichi.

These Mistris first moved into Saurashtra in early 7th century and later a major group entered Kutch in 12th Century & established themselves at Dhaneti. Later from 12th century onwards they moved between Anjar and Bhuj and founded the villages of Anjar, Sinugra, Khambhra, Nagalpar, Khedoi, Madhapar, Hajapar, Kukma, Galpadar, Reha, Vidi, Ratnal, Jambudi, Devariya, Lovaria, Nagor, Chandiya, Meghpar and Kumbharia.

References

Villages in Kutch district